Yangmaso Shaiza (1923 – 30 January 1984) was an Indian politician and the fourth Chief Minister of Manipur. He founded the Manipur Hills Union in 1974, and became the first chief minister from hill regions of the state.

Death
On 30 January 1984, Yangmaso was murdered by two assassins of the National Socialist Council of Nagaland (NSCN) at Nagaram, Imphal.

Legacy
As a far-sighted leader, Yangmaso and his policies has been considered as being highly visionary and cosmopolitan in nature. In a recent one-day seminar on "Yangmaso Shaiza and His Manipur" held on 9 March 2014 by the United All Communities Social Uplifters (UNACSU), Manipur, his legacy was summed up by Soso Shaiza as:

"As Chief Minister, he was convinced that the only way to maintain peace and harmony in the state was to reach out benefits to the remotest parts of the state and to bring development to both the hills and valleys, and to all tribes and communities. His vision was the accommodation and acceptance of all tribes and communities in Manipur. His dream was a rainbow concept of recognition and acceptance of the unique culture and character of all tribes and communities. For him, all human beings are brothers and sisters, since we are all children of God. His vision and ideals will be realised when all tribes and communities living in Manipur make his unity-rainbow concept a reality".

References

1923 births
1984 deaths
Assassinated heads of government
Assassinated Indian politicians
Chief Ministers of Manipur
Chief ministers from Janata Party
Manipur politicians
People murdered in India
Scottish Church College alumni
University of Calcutta alumni
India MPs 1977–1979
Lok Sabha members from Manipur
Janata Party politicians
Indian National Congress politicians from Manipur
People from Ukhrul district